2542 Calpurnia, provisionally designated , is a carbonaceous high-albedo asteroid from the outer regions of the asteroid belt, approximately 20 kilometers in diameter. It was discovered on 11 February 1980, by American astronomer Edward Bowell at Anderson Mesa Station, Flagstaff, United States. The asteroid was named after Julius Caesar's wife, Calpurnia.

Orbit and classification 

Calpurnia orbits the Sun in the outer main-belt at a distance of 2.9–3.4 AU once every 5 years and 6 months (2,024 days). Its orbit has an eccentricity of 0.07 and an inclination of 5° with respect to the ecliptic. In 1954, a first precovery was taken at the Palomar Observatory in California, extending the body's observation arc by 26 prior to its official discovery observation at Anderson Mesa.

Physical characterization

Diameter and albedo 

According to the surveys carried out by the Infrared Astronomical Satellite IRAS and NASA's Wide-field Infrared Survey Explorer with its subsequent NEOWISE mission, Calpurnia measures 27.6 and 20.854 kilometers in diameter, and its surface has an albedo of 0.0639 and 0.102, respectively. It has an absolute magnitude of 11.6.

Near-infrared spectroscopic observations, however, gave a higher albedo of 0.15 with a subsequently shorter diameter of 18 kilometers. Calpurnia has a featureless surface with up to 60% amorphous magnesium pyroxenes that might explain the high albedo for an carbonaceous outer-belt asteroid.

Lightcurve 

As of 2017, no rotational lightcurve has been obtained. The body's spectral type, as well as its rotation period and shape remain unknown.

Naming 

This minor planet was named after Calpurnia, the last wife of Julius Caesar. The approved naming citation was published by the Minor Planet Center on 8 April 1982.

References

External links 
 Asteroid Lightcurve Database (LCDB), query form (info )
 Dictionary of Minor Planet Names, Google books
 Asteroids and comets rotation curves, CdR – Observatoire de Genève, Raoul Behrend
 Discovery Circumstances: Numbered Minor Planets (1)-(5000) – Minor Planet Center
 
 

002542
Discoveries by Edward L. G. Bowell
Named minor planets
19800211
Calpurnia (wife of Caesar)